Samuel Charles Williams (born July 22, 1952), also known as Samaji Adi Akili, is a former American football defensive back who played three seasons in the National Football League (NFL) with the San Diego Chargers and Houston Oilers. He was drafted by the Chargers in the twelfth round of the 1974 NFL Draft. Williams enrolled at New Mexico Highlands University before transferring to the University of California, Berkeley. He attended Rockdale High School in Rockdale, Texas.

References

External links
Just Sports Stats
Sam Williams from Rockdale Reporter

Living people
1952 births
Players of American football from Texas
American football defensive backs
African-American players of American football
New Mexico Highlands Cowboys football players
California Golden Bears football players
San Diego Chargers players
Houston Oilers players
People from Cameron, Texas
21st-century African-American people
20th-century African-American sportspeople